Dark Tower is a 1987 horror film directed by Freddie Francis and Ken Wiederhorn and starring Michael Moriarty, Jenny Agutter, Theodore Bikel, Carol Lynley, Kevin McCarthy and Anne Lockhart. 

It was set and filmed in the Spanish city of Barcelona from a story by Robert J. Avrech.

Plot

After a window washer plunges to his death from a Barcelona high rise, several people come to investigate, including security consultant Dennis Randall (Michael Moriarty). He cannot locate a problem, but decides to investigate further when more gruesome deaths take place inside and around the office building. His investigations appear to show a sinister force behind all the deaths, a supernatural entity, that hates humans.

Cast
 Michael Moriarty as Dennis Randall
 Doug Jones as Dennis Randall - Corpse
 Jenny Agutter as Carolyn Page
 Carol Lynley as Tilly
 Theodore Bikel as Max Gold
 Kevin McCarthy as Sergie
 Anne Lockhart as Elaine
 Patch Mackenzie as Maria
 Robert Sherman as Williams
 Rick Azulay as Charlie
 Radmiro Oliveros as Joseph
 Jordi Batalla as Mueller
 Juame Ross as Beck
 Monica Fatjo as Rebecca
 Juan Ramon Romani as Philip Page
 Mara Bador as Rebecca's Mother

Reception

TV Guide awarded the film one out of five stars, calling it a "dull, talky, and incoherent haunted-skyscraper suspense thriller."

References

External links
 
 
 
 Mgm.com

1987 films
1987 horror films
American supernatural horror films
British supernatural horror films
Spanish horror films
Films directed by Freddie Francis
Films directed by Ken Wiederhorn
Films scored by Richard Einhorn
Films set in Barcelona
Films shot in Barcelona
Films set in apartment buildings
1980s English-language films
1980s American films